"The Winter Market" is a science fiction short story written by William Gibson and published as part of his Burning Chrome short story collection. The story was commissioned in 1985 by Vancouver Magazine, who stipulated that Gibson – who at the time was "unquestionably the leading Vancouver author on the international literary scene" – set it in the city (thereby making it unique among the author's works until 2007, when he set the final third of Spook Country in and around the Port of Vancouver).

The market of the title was modelled on that of Granville Island, though in a state of bohemian decay. As the author commented in a 2007 blog post: "Vancouver's Granville Island, centered around Granville Island Market (produce and food fair) is a very successful (and pleasant) retrofit of an under-bridge urban island that previously was heavily industrial. When the story was written, the retrofit was recent, and I dirtied it up for requisite punky near-future effect."

Plot
The story primarily concerns human relationships and their tenuous and problematic qualities by deploying the concept of technological immortality, in which one's consciousness is separated from the body and "uploaded" into a supercomputer, where it continues to think and function on its own. Characters in the story are marked by a distinct failure to connect, while they express typical genre concerns regarding this type of theoretical mind transfer; whether or not the online consciousness really is the same individual, and whether or not it was moral to allow this to happen. In this particular tale, Lise's original body is defective and failing, partially due to a congenital disease, and partially due to drug abuse. Hence, the act of leaving behind the original physical form is potentially one of escape into an untainted existence. However, the story undercuts this simplistic reading by convincingly evoking Lise's humanity and her longing for a "normal" relationship to her body.

Analysis

According to the analysis of critic Pramod Nayar, the story "depicts the body as a vehicle for experiencing dreams edited into Hollywood thrillers".

Critic David Seed saw the character of Rubin as a "thinly disguised" incarnation of performance artist Mark Pauline of Survival Research Laboratories.

Reception
The story was critically well-received, garnering nominations for the Hugo Award for Best Novelette, the Nebula Award for Best Novelette, the "short-form, English" Prix Aurora award, and the British Science Fiction Association award for best short story. It also finished highly in several science fiction magazines' annual readers polls in 1987, coming fourth in the Locus novelette category, third in the Interzone fiction category, and joint second in the Science Fiction Chronicle novelette category.

References

External links
"The Winter Market" at SFTropes
"The Winter Market" at the William Gibson Aleph

1985 short stories
Brain–computer interfacing in fiction
Cyberpunk short stories
Short stories by William Gibson
Vancouver in fiction
Works set in the 2010s
Short stories about diseases and disorders